The U.S. Post Office and Courthouse-Globe Main, in Globe, Arizona, was built in 1926.  Also known as Globe Post Office and Courthouse and as Globe Main Post Office, the building served historically as a courthouse of the United States District Court for the District of Arizona, and as a post office and reflects Beaux Arts architecture.  It was listed on the National Register of Historic Places in 1985.

Its NRHP nomination asserts that it "is a particularly well executed example of federal design in the Neo-Classical style."  Its construction was a local victory, an event "that symbolized the culmination of many years of effort in lobbying the federal government in order to secure their first and only federal building."

See also

Globe, Arizona
List of historic properties in Globe, Arizona
List of United States post offices

References 

Globe
Globe
Beaux-Arts architecture in Arizona
Government buildings completed in 1926
Buildings and structures in Globe, Arizona
Former federal courthouses in the United States
Courthouses in Arizona
1926 establishments in Arizona
National Register of Historic Places in Gila County, Arizona
Individually listed contributing properties to historic districts on the National Register in Arizona